Fernando Pereira Kosec (born 10 April 1966) is a Uruguayan trade unionist and politician who is the current President of the leftist coalition party Broad Front. He was also the president of the national trade union center PIT-CNT from 2015 to 2021.

References

Broad Front (Uruguay) politicians

Living people

Year of birth missing (living people)